George Thomas Johnson (born December 18, 1948) is an American retired professional basketball player. A 6'11" forward/center born in Tylertown, Mississippi and from Dillard University, he played in 13 National Basketball Association (NBA) seasons (1972–1983; 1984–1986) as a member of the Golden State Warriors, the Buffalo Braves, the New Jersey Nets, the San Antonio Spurs, the Atlanta Hawks, and the Seattle SuperSonics.

Johnson was a key reserve on the Warriors team that won the NBA Championship in 1975, and he grabbed 5,887 rebounds in his career. Johnson led the NBA in blocked shots per game three times, led the NBA in disqualifications in 1977–78 with 20, and was named to the NBA All-Defensive Second Team in 1980–81.  He blocked at least 10 shots in a game six times during his NBA career.

Johnson recorded the first five-by-five in NBA history, and is one of only twelve players to accomplish one. On March 26, 1978, he had 15 points, 18 rebounds, 5 assists, 5 steals and 7 blocks in a 118-104 victory over the Washington Bullets.

In 1981-82, Johnson started 62 games for the Spurs, helping them win the Midwest Division championship and reach the Western Conference finals. After San Antonio was swept by the eventual champion Los Angeles Lakers in a series in which Johnson was badly outplayed by Kareem Abdul-Jabbar, Spurs coach Stan Albeck determined the team was seriously deficient in the low post. Albeck sought a premier center, and got it by trading for Chicago Bulls All-Star Artis Gilmore, signaling the end of Johnson's time in San Antonio.

Inspired by his teammate Rick Barry, Johnson shot his free throws underhanded.

NBA career statistics

Regular season 

|-
| style="text-align:left;"| 
| style="text-align:left;"|Golden State
| 56 || – || 6.2 || .410 || – || .412 || 2.5 || 0.1 || – || – || 1.6
|-
| style="text-align:left;"| 
| style="text-align:left;"|Golden State
| 66 || – || 19.6 || .483 || – || .551 || 7.9 || 1.1 || 0.5 || 1.9 || 6.1
|-
| style="text-align:left;background:#afe6ba;"|†
| style="text-align:left;"|Golden State
| 82 || – || 17.5 || .476 || – || .659 || 7.0 || 0.8 || 0.4 || 1.7 || 4.4
|-
| style="text-align:left;"| 
| style="text-align:left;"|Golden State
| 82 || – || 21.3 || .484 || – || .673 || 7.6 || 1.0 || 0.6 || 2.1 || 4.9
|-
| style="text-align:left;"| 
| style="text-align:left;"|Golden State
| 39 || – || 15.3 || .487 || – || .806 || 5.4 || 0.7 || 0.4 || 1.9 || 4.4
|-
| style="text-align:left;"| 
| style="text-align:left;"|Buffalo
| 39 || – || 27.1 || .448 || – || .687 || 10.3 || 2.0 || 0.6 || 2.7 || 7.6
|-
| style="text-align:left;"| 
| style="text-align:left;"|New Jersey
| 81 || – || 29.8 || .395 || – || .719 || 9.6 || 1.4 || 1.0 ||style="background:#cfecec;"| 3.4* || 8.7
|-
| style="text-align:left;"| 
| style="text-align:left;"|New Jersey
| 78 || – || 26.4 || .427 || – || .761 || 7.9 || 1.1 || 0.9 || 3.2 || 6.6
|-
| style="text-align:left;"| 
| style="text-align:left;"|New Jersey
| 81 || – || 26.2 || .457 || .000 || .706 || 7.4 || 2.1 || 0.7 || 3.2 || 7.2
|-
| style="text-align:left;"| 
| style="text-align:left;"|San Antonio
| 82 || – || 23.6 || .473 || – || .734 || 7.3 || 1.1 || 0.6 ||style="background:#cfecec;"| 3.4* || 5.0
|-
| style="text-align:left;"| 
| style="text-align:left;"|San Antonio
| 75 || 62 || 21.0 || .467 || – || .672 || 6.1 || 1.1 || 0.3 ||style="background:#cfecec;"| 3.1* || 3.0
|-
| style="text-align:left;"| 
| style="text-align:left;"|Atlanta
| 37 || 0 || 12.5 || .439 || – || .737 || 3.2 || 0.5 || 0.3 || 1.6 || 1.7
|-
| style="text-align:left;"| 
| style="text-align:left;"|New Jersey
| 65 || 0 || 12.3 || .532 || 1.000 || .815 || 2.8 || 0.3 || 0.3 || 1.2 || 1.6
|-
| style="text-align:left;"| 
| style="text-align:left;"|Seattle
| 41 || 0 || 6.4 || .522 || – || .688 || 1.5 || 0.3 || 0.1 || 0.9 || 0.9
|- class="sortbottom"
| style="text-align:center;" colspan="2"| Career
| 904 || 62 || 20.0 || .451 || .500 || .694 || 6.5 || 1.0 || 0.5 || 2.5 || 4.8

Playoffs 

|-
|style="text-align:left;"|1973
|style="text-align:left;”|Golden State
|9||–||5.0||.400||–||.250||1.6||0.3||–||–||1.4
|-
| style="text-align:left;background:#afe6ba;"|1975†
|style="text-align:left;”|Golden State
|17||–||18.9||.571||–||.593||7.4||0.9||0.5||2.4||5.2
|-
|style="text-align:left;"|1976
|style="text-align:left;”|Golden State
|13||–||20.1||.574||–||.737||6.7||1.3||1.1||1.8||5.8
|-
|style="text-align:left;"|1979
|style="text-align:left;”|New Jersey
|2||–||35.0||.667||–||.333||12.5||1.0||1.0||3.5||14.5
|-
|style="text-align:left;"|1981
|style="text-align:left;”|San Antonio
|7||–||23.6||.462||–||.700||9.0||0.9||0.4||2.3||4.4
|-
|style="text-align:left;"|1982
|style="text-align:left;”|San Antonio
|9||–||19.4||.500||–||.600||5.1||1.3||0.7||1.7||1.2
|-
|style="text-align:left;"|1983
|style="text-align:left;”|Atlanta
|1||0||4.0||–||–||–||0.0||0.0||0.0||0.0||0.0
|- class="sortbottom"
| style="text-align:center;" colspan="2"| Career
| 59 || 0 || 17.7 || .551 || – || .618 || 6.1 || 0.9 || 0.7 || 2.0 || 4.2

See also
List of National Basketball Association career blocks leaders
List of National Basketball Association annual blocks leaders
List of National Basketball Association players with most rebounds in a game
List of National Basketball Association players with most blocks in a game

References

External links
Career Stats

1948 births
Living people
African-American basketball players
American men's basketball players
Atlanta Hawks players
Basketball players from Mississippi
Buffalo Braves players
Centers (basketball)
Chicago Bulls draft picks
Dillard Bleu Devils basketball players
Golden State Warriors players
New Jersey Nets players
People from Tylertown, Mississippi
Power forwards (basketball)
San Antonio Spurs players
Seattle SuperSonics players
21st-century African-American people
20th-century African-American sportspeople